Route 17 is a highway in central and southern Missouri.  Its northern terminus is at U.S. Route 54 in Eugene, which is six miles (10 km) northeast of Eldon; its southern terminus is at the Arkansas state line where it continues into Arkansas as Highway 395.  Between Waynesville and east of Laquey, part of the road was historic U.S. Route 66.
South of Interstate 44, Route 17 enters the Mark Twain National Forest and passes through the western edge of Fort Leonard Wood.

Originally, Route 17 terminated at Mountain View.

Major intersections

References

External links

017
Transportation in Howell County, Missouri
Transportation in Texas County, Missouri
Transportation in Pulaski County, Missouri
Transportation in Miller County, Missouri
Transportation in Cole County, Missouri
U.S. Route 66 in Missouri